Normal is a 2007 Canadian drama film about a group of unrelated people who are brought together in the wake of a deadly car crash. The film was directed by Carl Bessai, and stars Carrie-Anne Moss, Kevin Zegers, Callum Keith Rennie and Andrew Airlie.

Cast
Carrie-Anne Moss as Catherine  
Kevin Zegers as Jordie 
Callum Keith Rennie as Walt Braugher 
Andrew Airlie as Dale 
Tygh Runyan as Dennis Braugher 
Camille Sullivan as Denise 
Lauren Lee Smith as Sherri Banks 
Michael Riley as Carl 
Brittney Irvin as Melissa
Allison Hossack as Abby 
Cameron Bright as Brady 
Tara Frederick as Sylvie Farber 
Benjamin Ratner as Tim
Zak Santiago as Bob the Social Worker 
Hrothgar Mathews as Jerry

Awards

Rennie won the Genie Award for Best Supporting Actor at the 29th Genie Awards. The film was also a nominee for Best Picture, but lost to Passchendaele.

It won the award for Best Western Canadian Film at the 2007 Vancouver International Film Festival.

Reception
The film has a 0% approval rating on Rotten Tomatoes, based on five reviews.

References

External links
 

2007 films
Canadian drama films
English-language Canadian films
Films directed by Carl Bessai
Films scored by Clinton Shorter
2007 drama films
2000s English-language films
2000s Canadian films